Rachel Robinson (born 1922), is an American social activist, widow of baseball player Jackie Robinson and founder of the Jackie Robinson Foundation.

Rachel Robinson may also refer to:

Rachael Robinson Elmer
 Rachel Robinson, American singer/songwriter (also as "Rachel Starshine Robinson") and actress, among others e.g. from The Visitor (Star Trek: Deep Space Nine), daughter of Andrew Robinson
Rachel Robinson, contestant on Road Rules: Campus Crawl